Chyornoye is a rural locality (a settlement) in Solikamsky District, Perm Krai, Russia. The population was 1,014 as of 2010. There are 25 streets.

Geography 
Chyornoye is located 11 km east of Solikamsk (the district's administrative centre) by road. Kharyushina is the nearest rural locality.

References 

Rural localities in Solikamsky District